Kingsknowe is a suburb of Edinburgh the capital of Scotland. It is south-west of Craiglockhart, and borders Wester Hailes, Slateford and Longstone.

History
Knowe comes from the word Knoll, a small hillock. The Kings part of the name is not derived from a royal connection but takes its name from a local 17th century farm owner, William King. By 1964, the farm had been demolished to make way for a new housing estate in the area.

There are several listed buildings in Kingsknowe. These include the Category B listed Millbank house, an 18th century rubble-built building on the corner of Bank Road and Boag's Mill Road. Numbers 4, 8 and 10 Redhall Bank Road are Category B listed cottages that were built by Sir James Gowans circa 1850.

Transport
The area is served by Kingsknowe railway station which is part of the Edinburgh Waverley railway station to Glasgow Central station railway link. The railway station opened on 15 February 1848 but was known as Longstone. The station was subsequently renamed as Kingsknowe in 1853. While the station closed on 6 July 1964, demand saw it reopen on 1 February 1971.

The Union Canal passes to the north of Kingsknowe, forming the boundary with neighbouring Longstone. There is a footbridge over the canal that previously carried the branch Balerno line over the canal.

Community Facilities
Kingsknowe Golf Club is an 18-hole golf course in Kingsknowe that was founded in 1908.
 
Kingsknowe playing fields are home to Currie Star F.C., a local football club established in 1997. There are three pitches available to the public, a large open green and a pavilion building.

References

External links
Video footage of the station

Areas of Edinburgh